Royal Military College may refer to:

Australia
 Royal Military College, Duntroon, Campbell, Australian Capital Territory

Canada
 Royal Military College of Canada, Kingston, Ontario
 Royal Military College Saint-Jean, Saint-Jean, Quebec

Malaysia
 Royal Military College (Malaysia), Kuala Lumpur

United Kingdom
 Royal Military College, Sandhurst, Camberley, Surrey - the predecessor to the current Sandhurst Academy
 Royal Military College of Science, UK (now defunct)

See also
Royal Military Academy (disambiguation)